Christ Among Men is a 1906 Australian religious film from the Limelight Department of The Salvation Army in Australia. The film runs for about twenty minutes.

Plot
Peter's denial of Christ, the trial before Pilate, the scourging, the journey to Calvary, the crucifixion, death burial and resurrection of Christ.

References

1906 films
Australian silent short films
Australian black-and-white films
Limelight Department films